James from the kindred Győr (died 1314 or 1315) was a Hungarian nobleman at the turn of the 13th and 14th centuries, who served as Master of the cupbearers in 1291. Also known as James of Óvár then James of Kéménd in contemporary documents, he was the progenitor of the Gyulai, Geszti and Kéméndi noble families.

Life
James was born into the Óvár branch of the gens (clan) Győr of German origin, as one of the two sons of Conrad I, Master of the cupbearers. His brother was Stephen III (fl. 1302–14). He also had two sisters; Catherine, who married Miske Rátót, thus they became direct ascendants to the illustrious Batthyány family; and an unidentified sister, who married local noble George Balog of Harsány. In 1297 or 1298, James married Helena, the daughter of Nicholas Kán from the Siklós branch (and also a sister of Julius). Their marriage produced three or four children: Nicholas was the first member of the Gyulai family (who located in present-day Belvárdgyula) and also ancestor of its cadet branch, the Geszti family, while Conrad III settled down in Kéménd (today Máriakéménd) and became head of the Kéméndi family. James also had two daughters: Csala, who was betrothed to James, son of Mizse the Saracen and an unidentified daughter, who married Cibak Hont-Pázmány (she is possibly identical with Csala).

He is first mentioned by contemporary records in 1282, when his long-lived father Conrad was already expelled from his landholdings in Northwest Hungary by the powerful Kőszegi family. James and his brother Stephen III lived in Baranya County. There James embroiled in conflict with Kemény, son of Lawrence, ancestor of the Cseményi family, whose troops burned and perished his three villages, murdered his six Italian (or Walloon) serfs and captured and robbed James himself. He redeemed his freedom for 100 silver denari. In October 1285, the Pécs Chapter declared Kemény's act as unlawful and unfounded and ordered to pay damages. The chapter also sentenced Kemény to 73-day imprisonment beginning on 12 May 1286 to a house owned by the Dominican friars of Pécs. According to the verdict, Kemény had to apologize barefoot, with his belt off, begging to James after his release, but it is likely that the verdict was never implemented.

The Óvár branch's new seat was built in Kéménd by the early 1290s, where James also resided. As the Kőszegi dominion gradually expanded into the region Baranya, both Conrad and James became a loyal supporter of Andrew III of Hungary. James was appointed Master of the cupbearers for a short time in 1291. In the next year, he functioned as ispán of Moson County, but this position was merely nominal as the territory of the county was seized by the Kőszegis since the 1280s. Predominantly James appeared his father's side in contemporary documents.

After the death of Conrad between 1299 and 1302, James became patron of the family. During the era of interregnum (1301–1310), he had various conflicts and lawsuits with his neighbors (e.g. Lawrence Tétény), the Pécsvárad Abbey and his brother-in-law Miske Rátót. Sometimes after 1300, the Muslim-born noble Eyza (or Ejze) persuaded James to contribute the forced betrothal of his daughter Csala and Eyza's nephew James (son of the late Palatine Mizse). During that time Csala was less than 7 years old. When she reached adulthood in 1319, she broke off the engagement. In 1300s, James gradually lost his estates in Baranya County. Around 1313, John Kőszegi seized Kéménd Castle. James died not long after, in late 1314 or early 1315. His children were still minors during his time of death.

References

Sources

 
 
 
 
 

1310s deaths
13th-century Hungarian people
14th-century Hungarian people
James
Masters of the cupbearers